Vagabonds and Hooligans is the fifth album by Backyard Tire Fire, released on February 6, 2007.

Track listing
All songs written by Ed Anderson.
"Vagabonds and Hooligans" – 3:47
"Undecided" – 3:32
"Green Eyed Soul" – 3:23
"Apparitions" – 3:34
"Corinne" – 6:16
"A Long Time" – 3:42
"Tom Petty" – 1:58
"The Wrong Hand" – 3:20
"Don't Know What To Do" – 2:15
"Get Wise" – 4:35
"Downtime" – 3:32
"It's a Good Night" – 3:01

Personnel
Ed Anderson – vocals, acoustic, electric, slide, and baritone guitars, keyboards, percussion
Matt Anderson – bass, vocals, percussion
Tim Kramp – drums, percussion, vocals

with

Tony SanFilippo – synthesizers, percussion
Jerry Erickson – pedal steel guitar, dobro, slide guitar on "Green Eyed Soul"
Rob Hecht – violin
Michael T. Gardner – organ

External links
Backyard Tire Fire website

Backyard Tire Fire albums
2007 albums